Cindy Sander (born Sandmeier 31 March 1978 in Creutzwald) is a French singer.

Biography
She has been married to Sébastien Braun since 1998 and is the mother of Enzo, born on 26 May 2006.

According to the singer, she tried to participate in the 2001 Eurovision with her unreleased track Mensonges, and again in 2006 with another song.

In 2008, the general public discovered her in the French television show Nouvelle Star on M6. She did not win, but then she saw her notability maintained by an Internet phenomenon and participated in several other programs for the French television. Her song "Papillon de lumière" reached number 14 on the French SNEP Singles Chart. During that same year, Cindy Sander participated in her own reality TV show called Bienvenue chez les Sander, in which she showed her daily life with her family.

Discography

Albums
 2007 : Plus fort que l'amour

Singles
 1989 : "Notre Mélodie" – duet with Tanguy Cordary (7")
 2000 : "Mensonges"
 2000 : "D'Amour" / "Papillon de nuit"
 2008 : "Papillon de lumière"
 2009 : "Le Secret de nous"

References

External links
 Official site

1978 births
French-language singers
Internet memes
People from Creutzwald
Living people
Nouvelle Star participants
Sander, Cindy
21st-century French singers
21st-century French women singers